The 1991 Campionati Internazionali di San Marino was a men's tennis tournament played on outdoor clay courts at the Centro Tennis Cassa di Risparmio di Fonte dell'Ovo in the City of San Marino in San Marino and was part of the World Series of the 1991 ATP Tour. It was the third edition of the tournament and was held from 29 July until 4 August 1991. First-seeded Guillermo Pérez Roldán won his second consecutive singles title at the event.

Finals

Singles
 Guillermo Pérez Roldán defeated  Frédéric Fontang 6–3, 6–1
 It was Pérez Roldán's 1st title of the year and the 7th of his career.

Doubles
 Jordi Arrese /  Carlos Costa defeated  Christian Miniussi /  Diego Pérez 6–3, 3–6, 6–3

See also
 1991 Volvo San Marino Open – women's tournament

References

External links
 ITF tournament edition details

Campionati Internazionali di San Marino
San Marino CEPU Open
1991 in Sammarinese sport